Hypsopygia murzinalis is a species of snout moth in the genus Hypsopygia. It was described by Patrice J.A. Leraut in 2006 and is known from Cambodia.

References

Moths described in 2006
Endemic fauna of Cambodia
Moths of Asia
Pyralini